Brunotte is a surname. Notable people with the surname include:

Gary Brunotte (born 1948), American musician
Heinz Brunotte (1896–1984), German Lutheran theologian
Herm Brunotte (1921–2010), American basketball player
Karl Gottfried Brunotte (born 1958), German classical composer and music philosopher